"I Can't Come Down" is a song by English rock band Embrace and the fourth and final single from their number-one selling album, This New Day. It was released on 4 December 2006 as the follow-up to "Target". The B-sides included various versions of "I Can't Come Down", "Contender" and a live recording of the recently written "Heart & Soul". The single peaked at #54 in the UK Singles Chart, making it the lowest charting single by the band to date and their first to miss the UK Top 40.

Track listing
CD
I Can't Come Down
Contender (live at Birmingham Academy)
Heart & Soul (live at Manchester Academy)
I Can't Come Down (video)

7"
I Can't Come Down

Download versions of "I Can't Come Down"
Radio Edit
Album Version
Live Version
Demo Version
Acoustic Version

Charts

References

2006 singles
Embrace (English band) songs
Songs written by Richard McNamara
Songs written by Danny McNamara
2006 songs
Independiente (record label) singles